Mattia Camboni (born 26 April 1996) is an Italian competitive sailor.

He competed at the 2016 Summer Olympics in Rio de Janeiro, in the men's RS:X. and 2020 Summer Olympics, in RS:X.

References

External links
 

1996 births
Living people
Italian windsurfers
Italian male sailors (sport)
Olympic sailors of Italy
Sailors at the 2016 Summer Olympics – RS:X
Sailors at the 2020 Summer Olympics – RS:X
Mediterranean Games gold medalists for Italy
Mediterranean Games medalists in sailing
Competitors at the 2018 Mediterranean Games
Sailors of Fiamme Azzurre